Khadka, anciently called as Khaḍga, is a surname of Khas/Chhetri tribe. Khadga was an ancient Paikelā (warrior) rank along with Thāpā, Rānā and Buḍhā chhetri.

Kunwar Khadka clan

Prime Minister of Nepal Jung Bahadur Kunwar Rana belonged to the Kunwar family of the Khadka clan. The Kunwar family genealogy also states the title of 'Kunwar Khadka' which was taken by the ancestors of the Kunwar family.

After the premiership of Jung Bahadur Kunwar, the Kunwar family through a royal order took up the title of Rana and claimed themselves as Rajput family of Chittor in India and founded the Rana dynasty.

Notable people

 Hari Bahadur Khadka, Member of 2nd Constituent Assembly
 Hari Khadka, football player
 Khum Bahadur Khadka, former minister
 Kul Bahadur Khadka, Lieutenant General
 Narayan Khadka, ex minister of urban development
 Nirajan Khadka, football player
 Paras Khadka, cricket player
 Pradeep Khadka, actor
 Sumi Khadka, actress
 Swastima Khadka, actress
 Shweta Khadka, actress

See also 
 Katwal
 Rana
 Raut
 Thapa
 Karki

References

Books
 
 

Surnames of Nepalese origin
Khas surnames